Nice Girls Don't Explode is a 1987 American independent comedy film produced by Douglas Curtis, directed by Chuck Martinez, and starring Barbara Harris, Michelle Meyrink, William O'Leary, Wallace Shawn, and James Nardini. The film was released by New World Pictures.

Plot
April Flowers (Michelle Meyrink) is kept away from boys by her overprotective mother (Barbara Harris) because flames have a tendency to spontaneously erupt whenever her hormones are aroused; for April, "protection" on a dinner date is carrying a fire extinguisher. As her mother explains, April is a "fire girl," whose very unstable body chemistry causes spontaneous combustion when she is aroused. As such, the only men April meets more than once are firefighters.

When April reconnects with Andy (William O'Leary), a former neighbor who has returned to April's life, he challenges April's and her mother's assumption and presses his luck to prove to her that her hormones are not, in fact, explosive. Hijinks result; as Andy tries to prove his point and get the girl, he is thwarted at every turn by April's mother. Further complications ensue when April befriends a lonely, obsessive pyromaniac named "Ellen" (Wallace Shawn), who becomes incensed at the constant mishearing of his real name "Ellen" for "Helen," after which he throws Bic lighter flicking snits, trying to set his tormentors ablaze.

Production
Part of the film was shot in the cities of Lawrence, Kansas, Ottawa, Kansas, and Overland Park, Kansas.

Box office
Nice Girls Don't Explode had a domestic box-office total of only $65,000.

References

External links
 
 

1987 films
1987 comedy films
New World Pictures films
American comedy films
Films scored by Anthony Marinelli
1980s English-language films
1980s American films
1987 directorial debut films
Films about mother–daughter relationships